Serafim Ivanov Barzakov (born July 22, 1975, in Kolarovo) is a male freestyle wrestler from Bulgaria. He participated in Men's freestyle 66 kg at the 2008 Summer Olympics, Men's freestyle 66 kg at the 2004 Summer Olympics, Men's freestyle 63 kg at the 2000 Summer Olympics and Men's freestyle 57 kg at the 1996 Summer Olympics.

He won a silver medal at Men's freestyle 63 kg at the 2000 Summer Olympics.

He won a gold medal on 1998 FILA Wrestling World Championships (63kg) and 2001 FILA Wrestling World Championships (63kg).

He is also a silver medalist of 2003 FILA Wrestling World Championships (66 kg) and 2005 FILA Wrestling World Championships (66 kg).

External links
 Wrestler bio on beijing2008.com

Living people
1975 births
People from Petrich
Olympic wrestlers of Bulgaria
Wrestlers at the 1996 Summer Olympics
Wrestlers at the 2000 Summer Olympics
Bulgarian male sport wrestlers
Wrestlers at the 2004 Summer Olympics
Wrestlers at the 2008 Summer Olympics
Olympic silver medalists for Bulgaria
Olympic medalists in wrestling
Macedonian Bulgarians
World Wrestling Championships medalists
Medalists at the 2000 Summer Olympics
Sportspeople from Blagoevgrad Province
20th-century Bulgarian people
21st-century Bulgarian people